The Municipality of Odranci is a municipality in the traditional region of Prekmurje in northeastern Slovenia. Its seat and only settlement is Odranci. It was formed in 1994, when it was split from the Municipality of Lendava.

Flag
The flag and coat of arms of Odranci were adopted by the municipal authorities and published in the Official Gazette of the Republic of Slovenia in 1998.
The flag is rectangular, with a ratio of 1:2, vertically divided into three equal green, yellow, and red stripes, with the coat of arms set in the middle stripe. There is also a version for vertical hoisting, with the coat of arms rotated.

References

External links

Municipality of Odranci on Geopedia
Municipality of Odranci website

Odranci
1994 establishments in Slovenia